The 2014–15 Girona FC season is the 84th season in the club history.

Review of the season

July

August

September

October

November

December

January

February

March

April

May

June

Current squad

Players and staff

Squad information

Transfer in

Total spending:  €0

Transfer out
 
Total spending:  €0

Technical staff

Kits

|
|

Friendlies

Pre-season

Friendlies

Competitions

Overall

Liga Adelante

Matches
Kickoff times are in CET and CEST

Results by round

Results summary

League table

Copa del Rey

Copa Catalunya

Statistics

References

Girona FC
Girona FC seasons
Girona